= Gloria Morti =

Finnish metal band

Gloria Morti is a Finnish death metal band. They have released five albums.

The band signed with label Cyclone Empire in 2010.

== Discography ==
- Lifestream Corrosion (2004)
- Eryx (2008)
- Anthems of Annihilation (2010)
- Lateral Constraint (2012)
- Kuebiko (2016)
